Event Processing Technical Society (EPTS) is an inclusive group of organizations and individuals aiming to increase awareness of event processing, foster topics for future standardization, and establish event processing as a separate academic discipline.

Motivation 
The goal of the EPTS is development of shared understanding of event processing terminology.  The society believes that through communicating the shared understanding developed within the group it would become a catalyst for emergence of effective interoperation standards, would foster academic research, and creation of training curriculum. In turn it would lead to establishment of event processing as a discipline in its own right. The society is trying to follow example of the Database technology when relational theory provided theoretical foundation and homogenized the technology through introduction of Structured Query Language (SQL). The EPTS members hope that through combination of academic research, vendor experience and customer data they will be able develop a unified glossary, language, and architecture that would homogenize Event Processing in the similar way.

Organization 
The EPTS is organized into several working groups.

Use Case Working Group 
The Use Case WG collects and documents variety of usage scenarios of event processing in broad spectrum of applications. in order to classify such applications; The group has already collected use cases from Enterprise Information Technology Management, Fraud Detection, Business Process Management, Health Care, and Stock Trading. They have also created a comprehensive questionnaire to capture various facets of use cases. This data is used as input by the Architecture Working Group.

Architecture and Meta-Model Working Group 
The Architecture WG attempts to build a reference architecture for event processing. Since 2009 the meta-model working group has been merged with the reference architecture working group. The Meta Model WG serves as a liaison to a number of standards bodies. Members of this group are usually members of standards organizations such as OASIS, W3C, RuleML, OMG, DMTF and others - see the Event Processing standards reference model. The first version of the EPTS reference architecture is published.

Language Analysis Working Group 
The Language Analysis WG is collecting and organizing examples of various event processing languages used in industry and research in order to extract the language dimensions.

Interoperability Working Group 
The Interoperability WG is studying requirements for interoperability. Its goal is to get to a set of agreed mechanisms that would allow interoperability between event processing systems produced by different vendors.

Glossary Working Group 
The Glossary WG is developing a glossary of terms for Event Processing. The first version of the glossary is already published.
The glossary working group was led and its output was edited by Roy Schulte and David Luckham.

History 
The society started as an informal group in 2005/2006.  It was formally launched as a consortium in June 2008. Membership of the consortium is based on a formal agreement defining IP ownership terms and rules of engagement. The society is governed by a steering committee consisting of founding members of the organization, representatives of major vendors and scientists. It is partner of the major scientific event processing conference: Distributed Event Based Systems (DEBS), the major scientific rules conference: International Web Rule Symposium (RuleML)  and also launched two Dagstuhl seminars on event processing, one in May 2007, and the second was held in May 2010. The event processing community is still active, but the EPTS seems to be in a passive state at the moment. At least the website of the society is not active any more since mid of 2014.

Conferences 

 Dagstuhl seminar on event processing, May 2010
 5th Event Processing Symposium, Trento, Italy, Sep 2009
 DEBS 2009, Nashville, TN, USA
 Dagstuhl Seminars
 International Web Rule Symposium (RuleML)
 DEBS2007 Distributed Event Based Systems 2007, Toronto
 DEBS2008 Distributed Event Based Systems 2008, Rome
 DEBS2009 Distributed Event Based Systems 2009, Vanderbilt
 DEBS2010 Distributed Event Based Systems 2010, Cambridge
 DEBS2011 Distributed Event Based Systems 2011, New York
 DEBS2012 Distributed Event Based Systems 2012, Berlin
 DEBS2013 Distributed Event Based Systems 2013, Arlington
 DEBS2014 Distributed Event Based Systems 2014, Mumbai
 DEBS2015 Distributed Event Based Systems 2015, Oslo
 DEBS2016 Distributed Event Based Systems 2016, Irvine, California

See also
Complex Event Processing

References

External links 
 Event Processing Technical Society
 Business Wire press release announcing EPTS
 Complex Event Processing Forum
 Real-time Business Insight Event Processing in Practice, Event Processing Online Magazine

Blogs 
 Complex Event Processing & Real Time Intelligence site with pointer to the society's forum
 Blog of the EPTS chair Opher Etzion
 Tibco Complex Event Processing Blog
 EPTS and standardization

Computer science organizations
Events (computing)